Jalan Dangi–Kesang Pajak (Malacca state route M13 or Negeri Sembilan state route N13) is a major road in Malacca and Negeri Sembilan state, Malaysia.

List of junctions

Roads in Negeri Sembilan
Roads in Malacca